Indian mulberry may refer to:

 Morinda citrifolia, widely distributed tropically and may be used as a food source
 Morinda tinctoria, native to southern Asia and cultivated as a dye source

See also
 List of plants known as mulberry